Buskerud University College ( or HiBu) was a university college established 1 August 1994 and situated in Viken county, Norway. It merged with Vestfold University College on 1 January 2014 to form Buskerud and Vestfold University College.  This new school merged again on 1 January 2016 with Telemark University College into University College of Southeast Norway.

The University's campuses were located in three cities around Oslo: Kongsberg (technology and engineering), Drammen (political science, health science, teacher education, and design) and Hønefoss (business administration and management).

The institution had approximately 4500 students and 250 employees, and offered a broad range of bachelor and master programmes.

Courses in English
Besides the courses in Norwegian, the following departments also offered courses taught in English:
 Engineering
 Political science
 Tourism
 Visual communication
 Norwegian language and culture

Master's degrees in English were offered in systems engineering, human rights and optometry/visual science.

References
 Official website

University of South-Eastern Norway
Defunct universities and colleges in Norway
Education in Viken (county)
Educational institutions established in 1994
Educational institutions disestablished in 2014
1994 establishments in Norway
2014 disestablishments in Norway
Organisations based in Kongsberg